Miyana may refer to:

 Miyana (community), a Muslim community in India
 Miyana (Pashtun tribe), extinct peoples of Mianishin Mountains of Afghanistan
 Miyana (Mexico City), a mixed-use development in Mexico City
 Miyana (butterfly), a genus of butterflies in the family Nymphalidae found in South East Asia
 Mianeh (Iran), a city in Iran sometimes spelled Miyana